Frederick Stratton  (8 October 1913 – 2 April 2001) was an English haematologist and an internationally recognized expert in blood transfusion. He is known for discovering one of the Rh allelomorphs.

Stratton was born in Levenshulme, Manchester, England. After education at the Central Manchester Grammar School, he matriculated in 1931 at the University of Manchester, graduating in 1934 with BSc. He then studied medicine at the medical school of the University of Manchester, qualifying there MB ChB Manchester in 1937. After a brief time as a general practitioner, he joined in 1940 the Manchester Blood Depot as a medical officer and was soon appointed deputy to the director, John Frederick Wilkinson (1897–1998). In 1946 Stratton was appointed regional blood transfusion officer. He was the director of the Manchester Blood Centre from 1949 to 1980. With his deputy directory, Peter H. Renton, he wrote the important book Practical Blood Grouping (Oxford, Blackwell Scientific Publishing, 1958).

Stratton received his DPH in 1939, his research MD degree in 1944, and his DSc in 1957.

In 1947 he married Louisa A. Pineger in Ashton-under-Lyne. They had two sons.

Awards and honours
 1963 — FRCPath
 1963 — Percy Oliver Memorial Award of the Royal College of Pathologists
 1966 — FRCP
 1978 — Karl Landsteiner Memorial Award of the American Association of Blood Banks
 1987 — James Blundell Award of the British Blood Transfusion Society

References

1913 births
2001 deaths
Alumni of the University of Manchester
British haematologists
20th-century English medical doctors
Fellows of the Royal College of Physicians
Fellows of the Royal College of Pathologists